Clive White (17 January 1912 – 29 October 1979) was a South African cricketer. He played in three first-class matches for Border in 1936/37.

See also
 List of Border representative cricketers

References

External links
 

1912 births
1979 deaths
South African cricketers
Border cricketers
People from Makhanda, Eastern Cape
Cricketers from the Eastern Cape